HLA-B63 (B63) is an HLA-B serotype. The serotype identifies certain B*15 gene-allele protein products of HLA-B.

B63 is one of many split antigens of the broad antigen, B15. B63  identifies the B*1516 and B*1517 allele products.

Serotype

Alleles

References

6